Sherri Parker Lee Stadium is a softball stadium in Knoxville, Tennessee.  It is the home field of the University of Tennessee Volunteers college softball team.  The stadium opened in 2008 and holds 2,200 people.  The Stadium is named after former UT graduate Sherri Lee.

In 2010, the then-Lady Volunteers ranked 16th in Division I college softball in attendance, averaging 710 per home game.

In 2011, Sherri Parker Lee Stadium was recognized as the 2011 NFCA/Stabilizer Solutions Field of the Year Award Winner.

On May 28, 2017, with a trip to the NCAA Women's College World Series on the line, a record crowd of 2,459 witnessed the Lady Vols lose to the Texas A&M Aggies 5–3 in the NCAA Super Regional deciding game.

Unlike most stadiums in the SEC, fan access to the seating area is from a concourse at the bottom of the grandstand, not the top.  This means that as fans enter and walk around the concourse, they block the view of the fans already seated.  This problem is compounded by the handicap seating being on the field side of the concourse, obstructing the view of the fans sitting in the first few rows.  Most SEC stadiums feature a concourse at the top and no separation between the first row and the field.  This design also means that during television broadcasts, no fans are seen in the camera view.

References

College softball venues in the United States
Sports venues in Knoxville, Tennessee
Tennessee Volunteers softball venues
Sports venues completed in 2008
2008 establishments in Tennessee